Laura Gatto (born 4 March 1977) is a former Italian Long jumper.

Career
Her personal bests, 6.48 m set in 1999 was inside of the 60 best result in the year world top-lists.

National titles
Gatto won six national championships at individual senior level.

Italian Athletics Championships
Long put: 2000, 2001, 2002, 2004 (4)
Italian Athletics Indoor Championships
Long jump: 2000, 2005 (2)

References

External links
 

1977 births
Living people
Italian female long jumpers
Sportspeople from Treviso
Athletics competitors of Fiamme Azzurre
20th-century Italian women